Salgisgo-Itaoré is a town in the Ramongo Department of Boulkiemdé Province in central western Burkina Faso. It has a population of 3,508.

References

Populated places in Boulkiemdé Province